The Ruthenian Greek Catholic Church, also known in the United States simply as the Byzantine Catholic Church, is an Eastern Catholic church that uses the Byzantine Rite for its liturgies, laws, and cultural identity. It is one of the 23 sui juris Eastern Catholic churches that are in full communion with the Holy See and the rest of the Catholic Church. There are significant, culturally distinct communities in the United States, Canada, and Europe. In the United States, the Byzantine Catholic Metropolitan Church of Pittsburgh is self-governing (sui iuris). In Europe, Ruthenian jurisdictions are exempt, i.e. dependent directly on the Holy See. The European branch has an eparchy in Ukraine (the Eparchy of Mukacheve) and another in the Czech Republic (the Ruthenian Apostolic Exarchate of Czech Republic).

The Ruthenian Catholic Church has its origins from the 1646 Union of Uzhhorod, when Eastern Orthodox clergy were received into communion with the Holy See of Rome. The Ruthenian Catholic Church is rooted among the Rusyn people who lived in Carpathian Ruthenia, with Lviv long serving as a hub of this culture. This part of the Carpathian Mountains straddles the borders of the present-day states of Hungary, Poland, Slovakia, Romania and Ukraine. Today, the church is multi-ethnic. Members of the metropolitan province of Pittsburgh are predominantly English-speaking. Most are descendants of Rusyns – including sub-groups like the Boikos, Hutsuls and Lemkos – but the descendants of other nationalities are also present such as Slovaks, Hungarians and Croats as well as those of non-Slavic and non-Eastern European ancestry. The modern Eparchy of Mukacheve in Ukraine is mostly Ukrainian-speaking and remains officially part of the greater Ruthenian Church.

Name
While not directly associated with the former Ruthenian Uniate Church, the Ruthenian Greek Catholic Church also derives its name from the Rusyn and Ruthenian Slavic peoples of Eastern Europe and their communion with Rome. While Ruthenian Catholics are not the only Eastern Catholics to utilize the Byzantine Rite in the United States, the Ruthenian Greek Catholic Church refers to itself as the "Byzantine Catholic Church" within the U.S.

History
The Ruthenian Church originally developed among the Rusyn people of Carpathian Ruthenia as a result of the missionary outreach of Saints Cyril and Methodius who brought Christianity and the Byzantine Rite to the Slavic peoples in the 9th century. After the separation of the Catholic and Orthodox churches in 1054, the Ruthenian Church retained its Orthodox ties.

With the 1646 Union of Uzhhorod, 63 Ruthenian clergy were received into the Catholic Church, and in 1664 a union reached at Munkács (today Mukachevo, Ukraine) brought additional communities into the Catholic communion. The resulting dioceses retained their Byzantine patrimony and liturgical traditions, and their bishops were elected by a council composed of Basilian monks and eparchial clergy.

After almost a thousand years of Hungarian rule the region became, in part, incorporated in Czechoslovakia after World War I. Annexation to the Soviet Union after the war led to persecution of the Ruthenian Catholic Church. Since the collapse of Communism the Ruthenian Catholic Church in Eastern Europe has seen a resurgence in numbers of faithful and priests.

United States

In the 19th and 20th centuries, various Byzantine Catholics from Austria-Hungary arrived in the United States, particularly in coal mining towns. Members of the predominant Latin Church Catholic hierarchy were sometimes disturbed by what they saw as the innovation, for the United States, of a married Catholic clergy. At their persistent request, the Sacred Congregation for the Propagation of the Faith applied, on 1 May 1897, to the United States rules already set out in a letter of 2 May 1890 to François-Marie-Benjamin Richard, the Latin Archbishop of Paris. These rules stated that only celibates and widowed priests coming without their children should be permitted in the United States. 

The dissatisfaction of many Ruthenian Catholics had already given rise to some groups placing themselves under the jurisdiction of what is today the Orthodox Church in America (at that time a mission of the Russian Orthodox Church). The leader of this movement was the widowed Ruthenian Catholic priest Alexis Toth, whose mistreatment by Archbishop John Ireland of Saint Paul, Minnesota, led to Toth's transfer to Eastern Orthodoxy. He brought with him many Ruthenian Catholics, around 20,000 by the time of his death with many who followed afterward, and was canonized a saint by the Orthodox Church in America in 1996.

The situation with Alexis Toth and the Latin Catholic bishops highlighted the need for American Eastern Catholics to have their own bishop. Pope Pius X appointed the Ukrainian bishop Soter Ortynsky in 1907 as bishop for all Slavic Eastern Catholics of the Byzantine rite in America. For this period the Ruthenian Byzantine Catholics were united to the Ukrainian Greek Catholics in the same eparchy. Ethnic tensions flared due to cultural differences (mostly of a political nature) between Ukrainians who came from Austrian-ruled Galicia and the Rusyns and other Byzantine Catholics who came from the Kingdom of Hungary. 

This caused Rome to split the groups after Ortynsky's death by creating a new separate eparchy especially for Byzantine Catholics coming from Hungary - mostly Rusyns but also ethnic Hungarians, Slovaks, Croats and Serbs. The Rusyn priest Basil Takach was appointed and ordained in Rome on his way to America as the new eparchy's bishop. Bishop Takach is considered the first bishop of Ruthenian Catholics in America, and his appointment as the official founding of the Byzantine Catholic Metropolitan Church of Pittsburgh.

Clerical celibacy of American Eastern Catholics was restated with special reference to the Byzantine/Ruthenian Church by the 1 March 1929 decree Cum data fuerit, which was renewed for a further 10 years in 1939. Due to this and other similar factors, 37 Ruthenian parishes transferred themselves into the jurisdiction of the Greek Orthodox Ecumenical Patriarch in 1938, creating the American Carpatho-Russian Orthodox Diocese.

Relations with the Latin Church Catholic hierarchy have improved, especially since the Second Vatican Council, at which the Ruthenian Church influenced decisions regarding using the vernacular (i.e. the language of the people) in the liturgy. In its decree Orientalium Ecclesiarum, the Second Vatican Council declared: "The Catholic Church holds in high esteem the institutions, liturgical rites, ecclesiastical traditions and the established standards of the Christian life of the Eastern Churches, for in them, distinguished as they are for their venerable antiquity, there remains conspicuous the tradition that has been handed down from the Apostles through the Fathers and that forms part of the divinely revealed and undivided heritage of the universal Church."

The Second Vatican Council urged the Eastern Rite Churches to eliminate liturgical Latinization and to strengthen their Eastern Christian identity. In June 1999 the Council of Hierarchs of the Byzantine Metropolitan Church Sui Iuris of Pittsburgh U.S.A. promulgated the norms of particular law to govern itself. In January 2007, the Revised Divine Liturgy of St. John Chrysostom and the Revised Divine Liturgy of St. Basil the Great were promulgated. In December 2013, the Pope approved the request of the Congregation for the Eastern Churches that appropriate Eastern Church authorities be granted the faculty to allow pastoral service of Eastern married clergy also outside the traditional Eastern territory.

Membership within the Ruthenian Catholic Church, like the other sui iuris churches, is not limited to those who trace their heritage to the ethnic groups affiliated with the church.

Structure
The Ruthenian Greek Catholic Church has four eparchies in the United States, an apostolic exarchate in Canada serving Slovak Greek Catholics, and one eparchy and an apostolic exarchate in Europe. , its membership was estimated at some 419,500 faithful, with seven bishops, 664 parishes, 557 priests, 76 deacons, and 192 men and women religious.

Metropolia of Pittsburgh (one archeparchy, three suffragan eparchies, one exarchate, approximately 22,500 faithful)

 Byzantine Catholic Archeparchy of Pittsburgh (established in 1924)
 Ruthenian Catholic Eparchy of Parma (1969)
 Ruthenian Catholic Eparchy of Passaic (1963)
 Ruthenian Catholic Eparchy of the Holy Protection of Mary of Phoenix (founded 1981 at Van Nuys, transferred in 2010)
 Exarchate of Saints Cyril and Methodius of Toronto (2022, transferred from the Slovak Greek Catholic Church)

Immediately subject to the Holy See: (approximately 402,300 faithful)
 Greek Catholic Eparchy of Mukachevo in Ukraine (1771)
 Ruthenian Catholic Apostolic Exarchate of Czech Republic (1996)

One issue preventing organization of the Ruthenian Catholic Church under a single synod is the desire of some of the priests and faithful of the Eparchy of Mukacheve that it should be part of the Ukrainian Greek Catholic Church.

Saints
 Blessed Theodore Romzha, bishop and martyr
 Blessed Teresa Demjanovich, nun

See also
History of Christianity in Ukraine
Synod of Polotsk
Union of Brest
Andy Warhol
Ruthenian Catholic Church (disambiguation)

References

Further reading

External links

General Information:
Byzantine Catholic Church - The Carpathian Connection
Byzantine Catholic Church in America (unofficial)
What Is the Byzantine–Ruthenian Greek Catholic Church?
Byzantine Catholics: Who are we? 
"Ruthenian Catholic Churches": article by Ronald Roberson (Catholic Near East Welfare Association)
www.damian-hungs.de (in German)

History:

Eparchies:
List of Ruthenian Eparchies
 Мукачівська греко-католицька єпархія
Byzantine Catholic Eparchy of Parma
Byzantine Catholic Eparchy of Passaic
 Apoštolský exarchát řeckokatolické církve v České republice

Parishes:
Directory of Byzantine-Ruthenian Parish web sites

Documents:
Orientales Omnes Ecclesias: Encyclical of Pope Pius XII
Orientalium Ecclesiarum: Second Vatican Council

 
Carpathian Ruthenia
Eastern Christianity in Ukraine
1646 establishments in the Polish–Lithuanian Commonwealth
Eastern Catholic Churches
Eastern Catholicism